Watch Your Step is a 1922 American silent comedy film directed by William Beaudine. It stars Cullen Landis, Patsy Ruth Miller, Bert Woodruff, and George C. Pearce. Life considered the film to be a "fabulously expensive production". With no record of a print in any collection, it is likely a lost film.

Plot
As described in a film magazine, Elmer Slocum (Landis), a wealthy city youth, while trying to elude the police in his high powered automobile, has a smashup and, in a rough and tumble fight with a motorcycle policeman, knocks him out. He is robbed of his clothes by a group of tramps. He tries to hide from the police in a small village in Iowa and there meets Margaret Andrews (Miller), daughter of the richest man in town. He gets a position at a grocery store run by Russ Weaver (Woodruff) and learns that he has a rival for the hand of Margaret in Lon Kimball (Cannon), son of an undertaker. In a fight with Lon, Elmer comes off victorious, but a constable (Rattenberry) arrests him. Things look dark for Elmer until his father Henry Slocum (Cossar) with news that the motorcycle policeman has recovered and all has been forgiven.

Cast
 Cullen Landis as Elmer Slocum
 Patsy Ruth Miller as Margaret Andrews
 Bert Woodruff as Russ Weaver
 George C. Pearce as Lark Andrews 
 Raymond Cannon as Lon Kimball
 Gus Leonard as Jennifer Kimball
 Harry L. Rattenberry as the Constable
 Joel Day as Ky Wilson
 L.J. O'Connor as Detective Ryan
 John Cossar as Henry Slocum
 Lillian Sylvester as Mrs. Spivey
 Louis King as Lote Spivey
 Cordelia Callahan as Mrs. Andrews
 Alberta Lee as Mrs. Weaver

References

External links

1922 films
1922 comedy films
Silent American comedy films
American silent feature films
American black-and-white films
Films directed by William Beaudine
1920s American films